Our Smallest Ally: a brief account of the Assyrian Nation in the Great War is a book published in 1920 by William A. Wigram.
Wigram, an Anglican priest part of the Archbishop of Canterbury's mission to the Assyrians, gives a first-hand account of contributions of the Assyrian volunteers during the Great War.

The Assyrian nation 
The Assyrian nation was led by their Patriarch, Shimun XIX Benyamin, the circumstances of which were partly due to the Ottoman Millet system, in which religious bodies were treated as ethnic groups and were separated and afforded local autonomy. Upon joining on the side of the Allies during World War I, the Patriarch was special commander of one of the Battalions.

The efforts of the Patriarch's Assyrians on the side of Russia during the war, prior to the overthrow of Czar Nicholas II, were recognized in 1917 on 25 October, when 200 grade four Cross of St. George medals were delivered to Mar Benyamin to distribute to his soldiers that showed valor.

In addition, the Patriarch was decorated with the Order of St. Anna (pictured below) and was promised another additional order that only the Czar himself was able to bestow. However, the ousting of the Czar in the Russian Revolutions of 1917 prevented this second decoration being awarded to Mar Benyamin.
On 3 March 1918, Mar Benyamin along with many of his 150 bodyguards were assassinated by Simko Shikak (Ismail Agha Shikak), a Kurdish agha, in the town of Kuhnashahir in Salmas (Persia) under a truce flag, in the context of the ongoing Assyrian genocide. Czar Nicholas II himself was assassinated by the Bolsheviks along with his family in July 1918.

See also 
 William Ainger Wigram
 Assyrian people
 Assyrian volunteers
 Middle Eastern theatre of World War I, Mesopotamian campaign and Persian campaign (World War I)
 Assyrian Levies in the British Mandate in Iraq

References 

Assyrian Church of the East-related lists
Assyrian nationalism
Assyrian culture
Books about war
Books about Assyrian people
Books about Iraq
Books about British politicians
Books about Syria
Books about Turkey
Books about Iran